Saint-Constant station is a commuter rail station operated by Exo in Saint-Constant, Quebec, Canada. It is served by  the Candiac line.

Local transit connections
 CIT Roussillon route 35

References

External links
 Saint-Constant Commuter Train Station Information (RTM)
 Saint-Constant Commuter Train Station Schedule (RTM)

Exo commuter rail stations
Railway stations in Montérégie
Railway stations in Canada opened in 2001
Saint-Constant, Quebec
2001 establishments in Quebec